"Send in the Boys" is a song by English indie rock band Milburn and is featured on their debut album, Well Well Well. Released on 27 March 2006, it was the first single taken from the album and the band's first to chart in the UK Top 40, peaking at #22.

Track listing
CD (B000EPF8E4)
"Send in the Boys" (2:45)
"17" (2:58)
"Civic" (2:04)

7" side one
Send in the Boys 
17

7" side two
Send in the Boys 
Cheshire Cat Smile (Cool Catz Rendition)

2006 singles
Milburn (band) songs
Song recordings produced by Dave Eringa
2006 songs
Mercury Records singles